Pierre Antoine Deblois (October 15, 1815 – June 21, 1898) was a Quebec farmer and politician, a Conservative member of the Senate of Canada for La Salle division from 1883 to 1898.

Deblois was born in Quebec City in 1815 to Joseph Deblois and Marie Ranvoise. He was mayor of Beauport before he was named to the Senate in February 1883. He died in office in 1898.

Deblois' nephew, Sir Adolphe-Philippe Caron, was a member of the House of Commons and the cabinet of Sir John A. Macdonald.

References 

The Canadian parliamentary companion, 1891, JA Gemmill

1815 births
1898 deaths
Canadian senators from Quebec
Conservative Party of Canada (1867–1942) senators
Mayors of places in Quebec